Torbjørn Grytten (born 6 April 1995) is a Norwegian football striker who currently plays for 2. divisjon side Brattvåg.

Career
Grytten is from the village of Grytastranda, in the Ålesund municipality. He started his youth career with the Norborg sports club system. In 2010, started his senior career with Brattvåg, playing in the 3. divisjon. He joined the Aalesunds FK club, competing in Norway's top tier Tippeligaen, in the summer of 2011, making his league debut as a substitute in September 2012 against Tromsø. He signed a professional contract in March 2014.

In the summer of 2015 he went on a twelve-month loan back to Brattvåg. After the expiration of the loan period, the move was made permanent.

Grytten signed with Faroe Islands Premier League side KÍ Klaksvík for the 2019 season.

Career statistics

Club

Honours
 KÍ Klaksvík
Faroese Premier League (1): 2019

References

External links

1995 births
Living people
People from Haram, Norway
Norwegian footballers
Aalesunds FK players
Brattvåg IL players
Eliteserien players
Norwegian Second Division players
KÍ Klaksvík players
Faroe Islands Premier League players
Association football forwards
Norwegian expatriate footballers
Expatriate footballers in the Faroe Islands
Norwegian expatriate sportspeople in the Faroe Islands
Sportspeople from Møre og Romsdal